Jan Stanisławski (1893–1973) was a Polish lexicographer.

Before World War II, as a lecturer in English at the Jagiellonian University in Kraków, Poland, Stanisławski compiled an English-Polish, Polish-English dictionary. This one-volume dictionary was reprinted during World War II in Great Britain (first reprint, March 1940).

Stanisławski subsequently augmented this modest dictionary into what became The Great English-Polish, Polish-English Dictionary (Wielki słownik angielsko-polski, polsko-angielski) published (variously, in 2 or 4 volumes) in Poland.

See also
List of Poles

1893 births
1973 deaths
Academic staff of Jagiellonian University
Polish lexicographers
20th-century lexicographers